The Northern Metropolitan Football League (NMFL) was an Australian rules football competition based in the northern suburbs of Adelaide, South Australia until it folded at the end of the 1994 season. It first formed in 1961 as the Central District Football Association, drawing from the recruiting zone of the Central District Football Club.   In 1988, it was renamed the Northern Metropolitan Football League which remained its name until it folded at the end of the 1994 season.

Member Clubs

Premierships

References 

1961 establishments in Australia
1994 disestablishments in Australia
Defunct Australian rules football competitions in South Australia